EOA may refer to:

 Eoa (moth), a genus of moth
 Early-onset Alzheimer's disease, Alzheimer's disease diagnosed before the age of 65
 Empire of Austenasia, a micronation and self-declared sovereign state in the United Kingdom
 European Online Academy, a distance university specialized in European studies
 Encyclopedia of Arkansas History & Culture, a web-based reference work
 Eve of Alana, a German band
 East of Adelaide, a collection of neighbourhoods in London, Ontario
 Effective orifice area, a quality measure for artificial heart valves
 End of address, an ASCII control code